Marc Kinchen (born August 3, 1972), known by his initials MK, is an American DJ, record producer and remixer. He hit number-one on the US Billboard Hot Dance Music/Club Play chart in 1993 and 1994 with the songs "Always" and "Love Changes". Lead vocals on both of those tracks were performed by Alana Simon (songs were credited to MK featuring Alana). The combo also recorded the underground house music classic anthem "Burning". "Always" peaked at number 69 on the UK Singles Chart in February 1995. MK also hit the dance chart with "4 You", using the pseudonym 4th Measure Men.

In November 2013, his remix of Storm Queen's song "Look Right Through" was released on Defected Records and Warner Music and reached number-one on the UK Singles Chart.

Aside from his own career as a recording artist, he is also known for the remixes he produced for other artists, such as Celine Dion's single "Misled", which became the first number-one Billboard Dance/Club Play chart hit of Dion's career. His remixes of Betty Boo's single "Thing Goin' On" brought the song to number five on the same chart. His remixes of "The Message" by Sofia Shinas reached number 20 on the Dance/Club Play chart. He also produced the remixes of Jody Watley's single "Your Love Keeps Working On Me", which reached number two on that chart. Latest remixes and productions include Lana Del Rey, Dev, Enrique Iglesias, Sky Ferreira, Ellie Goulding, Jamie Jones, Lee Foss, and Tricky.

Kinchen is responsible for the iconic remix of the Nightcrawlers' record "Push the Feeling On". The remix was successful internationally, becoming a number three UK hit. He also assisted Nightcrawlers front-man John Reid with a number of his further releases, but they did not have the same impact on the charts.
In April 2021, Kinchen scored his first number one on Billboard's Dance/Mix Show Airplay chart as a featured artist on Anabel Englund's "Underwater," which he also co-produced.

Musical career

Production
In 2001, Kinchen moved to Los Angeles and started working with Denise Martell, who brought Kinchen in to begin working with David Foster.

In 2002, Kinchen became an in-house producer for actor and singer Will Smith. Kinchen then worked on Shark's Tale, did production on one of Will Smith's albums, and did the music of the TV show All of Us, which was produced by Smith. Marc Kinchen is also producing for Willow and Jaden Smith with his production partner and other half of Stoopid Robots, Omarr Rambert.

Kinchen worked on projects with Diane Warren and Pitbull. Kinchen worked with Pitbull as a producer and produced three songs on the latter's Armando album (2010), two songs on the Planet Pit album (2011), and co-produced the theme song for Men in Black 3, "Back in Time" by Pitbull.

Kinchen also produced music in collaboration with Blinded in March 2014. In the same year, British DJ Route 94 remixed Kinchen's track "Always", which went on to peak at number 12 on the UK Singles Chart.

In 2022, MK was supported at his Dublin show in 3Arena by Belters_Only, Subsequently they worked on a Remix of Kinchen's hit song, Teardrops on the dancefloor.

Discography

Albums
Surrender (with Alana Simon) (1993)
Defected Presents House Masters: MK (2011) 
Defected Presents MK in the House (2013) 
Defected Presents House Masters: MK (Second Edition) (2013)

Singles

Songwriting and production credits

See also
List of Billboard number-one dance club songs
List of artists who reached number one on the U.S. Dance Club Songs chart
List of artists who reached number one on the U.S. dance airplay chart

References

1972 births
Living people
Remixers
American DJs
American house musicians
Record producers from Michigan
Musicians from Detroit
DJs from Detroit
Charisma Records artists
Deep house musicians
Electronic dance music DJs